The Pittsburgh City Council serves as the legislative body in the City of Pittsburgh. It consists of nine members. City council members are chosen by plurality elections in each of nine districts. The city operates under a mayor-council system of local governance.

Current membership
The current members of the city council are:

† Denotes Council President (since 2020)

‡ Denotes Council President pro tempore (since 2020)

Past presidents
Bruce Kraus 2014–2020
Darlene Harris 2010–2014
Doug Shields 2006–2010
Luke Ravenstahl 2005–2006
Gene Ricciardi 2002–2005
Bob O'Connor 1998–2002
Jim Ferlo 1994–1998
Jack Wagner 1990–1994
Ben Woods 1988–1990
Sophie Masloff 1988
Ben Woods 1985–1988
Robert Rade Stone 1985
Eugene "Jeep" DePasquale 1978–1984
Richard Caliguiri 1977–1978
Louis Mason 1970–1977
John F. Counahan 1968–1970
Thomas Gallagher 1936–1959
Robert Garland 
James F. Malone 
James Ross 1817

Past members

Corey O'Connor (2012–2022)
Darlene Harris (2006–2020)
Daniel Gilman (2014–2018)
Natalia Rudiak (2009–2018)
Patrick Dowd (2008–2013)
Bill Peduto (2002–2014)
Barbara Burns (2000–2004) 
Sala Udin (1997–2007)
Dan Onorato (1992–2000)
Bob O'Connor (1991–2003)
Gene Ricciardi (1988–2006)
Christopher Smith (1993–1994)
Jake Milliones (1990–1993)
Michael Coyne (1988–1992)
Bernard Regan (1988–1992)
Jack Wagner (1984–1994)
Alan Hertzberg (1994–2005)
Jim Ferlo (1988–2002)
Otis Lyons Jr. (1988–1989)
Mark Pollock (1986–1989)
Stephen Grabowski (1984–1988)
Ben Woods (1981–1989)
Thomas E. Flaherty (1980–1983)
Jim O'Malley (1980–1987)
Michelle Madoff (1978–1994)
William Robinson (1978–1985)
Jim Bulls (1977–1980)
Sophie Masloff (1976–1988)
Richard E. Givens (1976–1987)
James Lally (1976–1980)
Frank Lucchino (1974–1978)
John Lynch (1970–1976)
William J. Coyne (1974–1981)
Robert Rade Stone (1973–1985)
Eugene DePasquale (1972–1984, 1988–1989)
Richard Caligiuri (1970–1977)
Charles Leslie (1970–1972)
Amy Ballinger (1970–1976)
James Cortese (1970)
George Shields (1970–1974)
John Lynch (1970–1976)
Edgar Michaels (1969–1974)
Thomas Fagan (1968–1973)
Louis Mason Jr. (1967–1977)
Peter Flaherty (1966–1970)
Walter Kamyk (1963–1970)
Charles Leslie (1961–1969)
Phillip Baskin (1962–1970)
James Jordan (1960–1967)
Horner Green (1960–1961)
George Shields (1970–1974)
Edgar Michaels (1969–1974) 
J. Craig Kuhn (1959–1970)
Charles McCarthy (1958–1963)
David Olbum (1956–1961)
Irma D'Ascenzo (1956–1970)
Paul Jones (1954–1960)
Emanuel Schifano (1952–1956)
Bennett Rodgers (1952–1959)
Charles Dinan (1952–1958)
John Counahan (1952–1970)
William Davis (1951–1953)
Patrick Fagan (1950–1967)
Frederick Weir (1947–1960)
William Alvah Stewart (1946–1951)
Joseph A. McArdle (1942–1949)	
Thomas Kilgallen (1940–1951)
John Duff Jr. (1940–1952)
Edward Leonard (1939–1951)
A.L. Wolk (1938–1956)
James A. O'Toole (1936–1941)
Frederick Weir (1936–1947)
Cornelius Scully (1935–1936)
George Evans (1935–1945)
William Magee (1934–1937)
John Jane (1934–1935)
John Houston (1934–1935)
Thomas Gallagher (1934–1965)
Walter Demmer (1934–1951)
Frank Duggan (1933)
George Oliver (1933)
William Soost (1932–1935)
John Phillips (1931–1932)
Michael Muldowney (1930–1933)
Clifford Connelley (1930–1933)
George J. Kambach (1929–1931)
Harry A. Little (1926–1933)
Robert J. Alderdice (1924–1932)
Joseph F. Malone (1922–1930)
Wallace Borland (1922–1925)
Charles Anderson (1920–1939)
A.K. Oliver (1919–1921)
John H. Henderson (1919–1921)
Daniel Winters (1918–1929)
William J. Burke (1918–1919)
William H. Robertson (1916–1924)
John H. Dailey (1916–1921)
P.J. McArdle (1911–1913, 1916–1919, 1922–1930, 1932–1940)
Charles H. Hetzel (1914–1915)
W.Y. English (1914–1933)
John S. Herron (1914–1933)
G.A. Dillinger (1913–1917)
Robert Garland (1911–1939)
S.S. Wooburn (1911–1939)
W.G. Wilkins (1911–1913)
Enoch Rauh (1911–1919)
James P. Kerr (1911–1918)
John M. Goehring (1911–1915)
W.A. Hoeveler (1911–1914)
Edward V. Babcock (1911–1913)
David P. Black (1911)
A.J. Kelly (1911)
Robert McKnight (1847–1849)

See also
List of mayors of Pittsburgh
Pittsburgh Mayoral Chief of Staff

References

External links
 official city website

Government of Pittsburgh
Pennsylvania city councils